Sanga language may refer to:
 Sanga language (Nigeria), a language of Nigeria
 Sanga language (Bantu), a language of the Democratic Republic of Congo